Brook Green is an affluent London neighbourhood in the London Borough of Hammersmith and Fulham. It is bordered by Kensington, Holland Park, Shepherd's Bush, Hammersmith and Brackenbury Village.

The Brook Green neighbourhood takes its name after the recreational park space also named Brook Green, which runs from Shepherd's Bush Road to Hammersmith Road.

The area is principally composed of tree-lined streets with Victorian townhouses and boasts a significant French and Italian, as well as growing Chinese, expatriate community.

Brook Green itself and adjacent streets are among the most prestigious and expensive residential addresses in the London Borough of Hammersmith and Fulham due to their proximity to leading schools such as St Paul's Girls' School, Bute House Preparatory School for Girls, St James Independent Schools, Ecole Francaise Jacques Prevert, and Kensington Wade.

Brook Green has two main shopping areas, Shepherd's Bush Road and Blythe Road, the latter of which is home to a number of small, independent shops. Also tucked in behind the green is a large Tesco supermarket. Brook Green is also close to Kensington High Street, King Street and Westfield London.

At the centre of the green stands Brook Green Pavilion cafe, ran by Bears ice cream Company. The cafe serves locally produced ice cream, coffee, toasties pastries and other delights.

History

The name Brook Green is first recorded in 1493, and the hamlet was established by the 16th century. The area was developed as industrialisation spread out of London. Businesses in Brook Green included the Osram Lamp Factory, now converted into social housing, J. Lyons and Co. and its complex at Cadby Hall, and Post Office Savings Bank Headquarters in Blythe Road.  Brook Green was also home to St Mary's College from 1850 to 1925, when the college moved to Strawberry Hill.

St Paul's Girls' School, one of the leading independent schools in the country, has been situated on Brook Green since its foundation in 1904. The composer Gustav Holst was Director of Music at the school from 1905 to 1934, and in 1933 wrote Brook Green Suite for the school's junior orchestra.

The Brook Green Hotel has stood at the western end of Brook Green since 1886. The original brook, which was covered over in the 19th century, still flows under the hotel. The area's inns – the Brook Green Hotel and the Queen's Head – were originally coach houses, and became popular entertainment venues. Today, the Brook Green Hotel is a pub on ground level, along with a cocktail bar in the basement below and a hotel upstairs. The Queen's Head overlooks the green itself at the front and has a garden at the back.

Brook Green boasts four English Heritage blue plaques: they commemorate the artist Sir Frank Short, the composer Gustav Holst, the Silver Studio of design, and the writer Elizabeth Anne Finn (founder of the charity now known as Elizabeth Finn Care). There is also Brook Green Market and Kitchen, a FARMA certified farmers market in Addison Primary School.

Education
St Paul's Girls' School
Bute House Preparatory School for Girls
Ecole Francaise Jacques Prevert
Kensington Wade
St James Independent Schools
Larmenier and Sacred Heart Catholic School
Sacred Heart High School
Addison CE Primary School
Lena Gardens Primary School
Avonmore Primary School
St Mary's Catholic Primary School
Lionheart Education (private tutorial college)

Notable residents 
 Ken Suttle
 Elizabeth Anne Finn
 Angelo Colarossi
 Mischa Barton
 Richard Eyre
 John Silvester Varley
 Francis Job Short

Notable businesses 

 Immediate Media Co
 Liberty Global
 Harrods
 L'Oréal
 Fever-Tree
 CH2M
 Charlotte Tilbury
Formerly:
 EMI
 The Silver Studio
 Omnifone
 Virgin

Nearest places
Places adjoining Brook Green:
 Kensington
 Holland Park
 Hammersmith
 Shepherd's Bush
 West Kensington

Transport
Stations:
 Kensington Olympia station
 Barons Court tube station
 Shepherd's Bush tube station
 Shepherd's Bush railway station
 Hammersmith tube station (Piccadilly and District lines)
 Hammersmith tube station (Circle and Hammersmith & City lines)
 Goldhawk Road tube station

London Underground Lines:
 District line
 Piccadilly line
 Hammersmith & City line
 Central line

Cultural references
Brook Green, Hammersmith, appears as "Brugglesmith" in the Rudyard Kipling story of the same name which was first published in 1891. The story is a farce in which the narrator, who it is implied is William Thackeray, has to escort a drunken sailor back to his wife.

See also 
 Hammersmith and Fulham parks and open spaces
 18 and 19 Brook Green

References
Footnotes

Bibliography

External links

 Friends of Brook Green

Areas of London
History of the London Borough of Hammersmith and Fulham
Districts of the London Borough of Hammersmith and Fulham
Common land in London
Places formerly in Middlesex